The Western Australian Oaks is a Perth Racing Group 3 Thoroughbred horse race for three-year-old fillies at set weights run over 2400 metres, held at Ascot Racecourse in Perth, Western Australia each year in April. Total prize money is A$250,000.

History

Grade

1953–1978 -  Principal Race
1979–1991 -  Group 1
1992–2006 -  Group 2
 2006 onwards -  Group 3

Distance
 1953–1971 - 1 miles (~2400 metres)
 In 1983 and 2005 the distance of the race was 2182 metres.

Venue
 In 1983 and 2005 the race was run at Belmont Park Racecourse.

Winners

 2022 - Lady Chant
 2021 - Lunar Impact
 2020 - Tuscan Queen
 2019 - Dark Choice
 2018 - Special Alert
 2017 - Very Tempting
 2016 - First Impressions
 2015 - Delicacy
 2014 - Balmont Girl
 2013 - Moreish
 2012 - Pop Culture
 2011 - Dreamaway
 2010 - Impressive Jeuney
 2009 - Cassandara Shadow
 2008 - Grand Journey
 2007 - Westerly Breeze
 2006 - Moodometer
 2005 - Royal Drive
 2004 - Fatal Attraction
 2003 - Superior Star
 2002 - Honor Lap
 2001 - ¶Race not held
 2000 - Old Money
 1999 - Reflected Image
 1998 - Matriculate
 1997 - Mystic Chantry
 1996 - Fabulous
 1995 - Unpretentious
 1994 - Beaux Art
 1993 - Leeuwin Concert
 1992 - Jevresa
 1991 - India's Dream
 1990 - Natasha
 1989 - Hasty Departure
 1988 - Trappings
 1987 - Judyann
 1986 (Nov.) - Send Me An Angel
 1986 (Apr.) - †Cologne
 1985 - Contwig
 1984 - True Devotion
 1983 - Lowanna Rose
1982 - Magic Gauntlet
1981 - Badinage
1980 - Queen Inca
1979 - ‡Gay Affair / Brechin Castle
1978 - Autumn Talk
1977 - Adaptable
1976 - Lovely Curves
1975 - Vatilla
1974 - Our Pocket
1973 - Paper Honey
1972 - Maple Twig
1971 - Sovereignito
1970 - Star Supreme
1969 - Baywana
1968 - Painted Rose
1967 - Kaytello
1966 - Muette
1965 - Carol's Choice
1964 - Sweet Saga
1963 - Swell Baby
1962 - Activity
1961 - Blue Rose
1960 - Queen Of The Nile
1959 - Lalisse
1958 - Cheeky Jan
1957 - Fairflow
1956 - Dawdie
1955 - Craghill
1954 - Finesta
1953 - Copper Beech

¶ Race moved in racing calendar forward to autumn of 2002
† Race was run twice in 1986 since it was moved in the racing calendar from autumn (April) to spring (late November)
‡ Dead heat

See also

 List of Australian Group races
 Group races

References

Horse races in Australia
Flat horse races for three-year-olds
Sport in Perth, Western Australia